The Pražák Quartet (in Czech: Pražákovo kvarteto) is a Czech string quartet established in 1974. It is one of the Czech Republic's premiere chamber ensembles. It was founded while its members were still students at Prague Conservatory (1974–1978). The quartet was awarded First Prize at the Evian International Competition in 1978 and the Prague Spring Festival Prize in 1979 with second places not being awarded at both the competitions to indicate the difference in level.

Members
 First violin:
 1974-2010: Václav Remeš
 2010-2015: Pavel Hůla
 Since 2015: Jana Vonášková
 Second violin: 
 1974-2021: Vlastimil Holek
 Since 2021: Marie Magdalena Fuxová
 Viola: Josef Klusoň
 Cello: 
 1974-1986: Josef Pražák
 1986-2021: Michal Kaňka
 Since 2021: Pavel Jonáš Krejčí

Recordings 
The Prazak Quartet has made more than 60 recordings during its long history, including some of the most important works in the string quartet and chamber music literature.  They record for Praga Digitals. A partial discography includes:

Ludwig van Beethoven - String Quartet op. 18, no. 1, 4, 5
Ludwig van Beethoven - String Quartet op. 18, no. 2, 3, 6
Ludwig van Beethoven - Quartets op. 59 Razumovsky
Ludwig van Beethoven - String Quartet op. 74 and 95
Ludwig van Beethoven - String Quartet op. 127 and 131
Ludwig van Beethoven - String Quartet op. 132 and 135
Alban Berg / Anton Webern - String Quartets
Anton Webern - String Quartet, Op. 28 (1938)
Johannes Brahms - String Quartet No. 3 in B flat major, Op. 67, Piano Quintet in F minor, Op. 34
Johannes Brahms - String Quartet no 1 Op. 51/1, Clarinet Quintet Op. 115
Johannes Brahms - String Quartet no 2 in A minor, Op.51, String Quintet no 2 in G major Op. 111
Anton Bruckner -  String Quintet with viola, Wolfgang Amadeus Mozart - String Quintet with viola K. 516, Jan Talich : viola
Antonín Dvořák - String Quartet no 10 Op. 51 / B. 92 "Slavonic", String Quartet no 13 Op. 106 / B.192
Antonín Dvořák - String Quartet no 11 in C Op. 61 / B. 121, Cypresses (12) B. 152 - complete cycle for String Quartet
Antonín Dvořák - String Quartet no 12 in F major, Op. 96 / B 179 "The American", Terzetto in C major, Op. 74 / B 148, Bagatelles, Op. 47 / B 79
Antonín Dvořák - String Quartet no 14 Op. 105 / B. 193;String Quartet no 12 Op. 96 / B. 179 "The American"
Antonín Dvořák - Piano Quintet in A Op. 5 / B. 28 (1875);Piano Quintet in A Op. 81 / B.155 (1887), Ivan Klansky - piano
Arnold Schönberg - String Quartet no 1 in D minor Op. 7, String Quartet no 2 in F sharp minor Op. 10 with soprano, Christine Whittlesey, soprano
Josef Haydn - The Last Three String Quartets

External links
Prazak Quartet homepage

1974 establishments in Czechoslovakia
Musical groups established in 1974
Czech string quartets